Mooney Branch is a stream in Oregon County in the Ozarks of southern Missouri. It is a tributary of Frederick Creek.

Mooney Branch has the name of Joseph P. Mooney, a pioneer settler.

See also
List of rivers of Missouri

References

Rivers of Oregon County, Missouri
Rivers of Missouri